V4641 Sagittarii is a variable X-ray binary star system in the constellation Sagittarius. It is the source of one of the fastest superluminal jets in the Milky Way galaxy.

In 1999 a violent X-ray outburst revealed it to contain a black hole.

The star in the binary system is a late B class giant with a mass about three times that of the Sun.  It orbits a black hole about twice as massive every 2.8 days.  The star is distorted, which causes variations in its brightness as it orbits and rotates.  It is also slightly eclipsed by an accretion disc around the black hole. The system usually does not produce a significant amount of x-rays, but undergoes outbursts when the x-ray luminosity increases due to accretion onto the black hole driving superluminal jets.

References

External links
 AAVSO Variable Star of the Season, Summer 2006: V4641 Sgr
 V4641 Sgr – A Black Hole

B-type giants
X-ray binaries
Stellar black holes
Microquasars
Sagittarius (constellation)
Sagittarii, V4641